Shere Hite (November 2, 1942 – September 9, 2020) was an American-born German sex educator and feminist. Her sexological work focused primarily on female sexuality. Hite built upon biological studies of sex by Masters and Johnson and by Alfred Kinsey. She also referenced theoretical, political and psychological works associated with the feminist movement of the 1970s, such as Anne Koedt's essay The Myth of the Vaginal Orgasm. She renounced her United States citizenship in 1995 to become German.

Early life, education, and career
Hite was born Shirley Diana Gregory in St. Joseph, Missouri, to Paul and Shirley Hurt Gregory. Shortly after the end of World War II, when her parents divorced, she took the surname of her stepfather, Raymond Hite. She graduated from Seabreeze High School in Daytona Beach, Florida. After she received a master's degree in history from the University of Florida in 1967, she moved to New York City and enrolled at Columbia University to work toward her Ph.D. in social history. Hite said that the reason for her not completing this degree was the conservative nature of Columbia at that time.

In the 1970s, she did part of her research while at the National Organization for Women. She posed in the nude for Playboy while studying at Columbia University.

In 1988 she made an extended appearance on the British TV discussion programme After Dark, alongside James Dearden, Mary Whitehouse, Joan Wyndham, Naim Attallah and others.

Hite taught at Nihon University (Tokyo, Japan), Chongqing University in China, and Maimonides University, North Miami Beach, Florida, USA.

Research focus
Hite focused on understanding how individuals regard sexual experience and the meaning it holds for them. Hite believed that the ease at which women orgasm during masturbation contradicted traditional stereotypes about female sexuality. Hite's work concluded that 70% of women do not have orgasms through in-out, thrusting intercourse but are able to achieve orgasm easily by masturbation or other direct clitoral stimulation.

Hite, as well as Elisabeth Lloyd, have criticized Masters and Johnson for uncritically incorporating cultural attitudes on sexual behavior into their research; for example, the argument that enough clitoral stimulation to achieve orgasm should be provided by thrusting during intercourse, and the inference that the failure of this is a sign of female "sexual dysfunction." While not denying that both Kinsey and Masters and Johnson have played a crucial role in sex research, Hite believed that society must understand the cultural and personal construction of sexual experience to make the research relevant to sexual behavior outside the laboratory. She offered that limiting test subjects to "normal" women who report orgasming during coitus was basing research on the faulty assumption that having an orgasm during coitus was typical, something that her own research strongly refuted.

Methodology
Hite used an individualistic research method. Thousands of responses from anonymous questionnaires were used as a framework to develop a discourse on human responses to gender and sexuality. Her conclusions were met with methodological criticism. The fact that her data are not probability samples raises concerns about whether the sample data can be generalized to relevant populations. As is common with surveys concerning sensitive subjects such as sexual behavior, the proportion of nonresponse is typically large. Thus the conclusions derived from the data may not represent the views of the population under study because of sampling bias due to nonresponse.

Hite has been praised for her theoretical fruitfulness in sociological research. The suggestion of bias in some of Hite's studies is frequently used as a talking point in university courses where sampling methods are discussed, along with The Literary Digest poll of 1936. One discussion of sampling bias is by Philip Zimbardo, who explained that women in Hite's study were given a survey about marriage satisfaction, where 98% reported dissatisfaction, and 75% reported having had extra-marital affairs, but where only 4% of women given the survey responded. Zimbardo argued that the women who had dissatisfaction may have been more motivated to respond than women who were satisfied and that her research may just have been "science-coded journalism." Some or all of her published surveys depended on wide multi-channel questionnaire distribution, opportunity for many long answers on a respondent's own schedule, enforced respondent anonymity, and response by mail rather than polling by telephone. Sharon Lohr argues that the distribution of questionnaires to women's organizations and the length of the questions and the allowance for long responses introduces a bias towards people who are not typical. She also argues that several of the questions are leading the respondent to reply in a particular way.

Personal life

In 1985, Hite married German concert pianist Friedrich Höricke, who was 19 years her junior. The couple divorced in 1999. Hite was married to a second husband, Paul Sullivan, in 2012. They moved across Europe multiple times together, before finally settling in north London, England.

In 1995, Hite renounced her U.S. citizenship at the former Embassy of the United States in Bonn. She accepted German nationality because she regarded German society as more tolerant and open-minded about her endeavors. Due to renouncing citizenship prior to formally accepting German nationality, Hite temporarily became stateless.

In September 2020, Hite died of corticobasal degeneration at the age of 77.

Notable works
 Sexual Honesty, by Women, For Women (1974)
 The Hite Report on Female Sexuality (1976, 1981, republished in 2004)
 The Hite Report on Men and Male Sexuality (1981)
 Women and Love: A Cultural Revolution in Progress (The Hite Report on Love, Passion, and Emotional Violence) (1987)
 Fliegen mit Jupiter (English: Flying with Jupiter) (1993)
 The Hite Report on the Family: Growing Up Under Patriarchy (1994)
 The Hite Report on Shere Hite: Voice of a Daughter in Exile (2000, autobiography)
 The Shere Hite Reader: New and Selected Writings on Sex, Globalization and Private Life (2006)

Notes

External links

 – Hite Research Foundation

1942 births
2020 deaths
American feminists
American emigrants to Germany
20th-century American novelists
American sexologists
Columbia University alumni
Feminist studies scholars
German feminists
German sexologists
Naturalized citizens of Germany
Academic staff of Nihon University
Academic staff of Chongqing University
People from St. Joseph, Missouri
Sex educators
University of Florida College of Liberal Arts and Sciences alumni
Former United States citizens
German women novelists
Seabreeze High School alumni
20th-century American women writers
Novelists from Missouri
American women novelists
Sex-positive feminists
American women academics
21st-century American women
Neurological disease deaths in England
Deaths from corticobasal degeneration